Man at Sea (translit. Anthropos sti thalassa) is a 2011 Greek drama film directed by Constantine Giannaris.

Plot
Alex, the captain of a Greek oil tanker, is still dealing with the death of his son four years ago. While his ship the "Sea Voyager" is in the Mediterranean Sea, Captain Alex comes across a boat filled with adolescent refugees from Iran, Iraq, and Afghanistan. He takes pity on the refugees and allows them on his ship. He plans to drop the refugees off at a port, but local authorities refuse to take them, forcing the refugees to stay on the boat. Their residence angers the ship's owners, and gradually the "Sea Voyager" becomes a claustrophobic war zone between the refugees and the ship's owners.

Cast
 Antonis Karistinos as Alex
 Theodora Tzimou as Katia
 Konstadinos Avarikiotis as Andreas
 Konstadinos Siradakis as Pantelis
 Stathis Papadopoulos as Yuri
 Thanasis Tatavlalis as Petros
 Nikos Tsourakis as Samir
 Stathis Apostolou as Johnny
 Chalil Ali Zada as Rafik
 Rahim Rahimi as Kamal

Reception
"Man at Sea" was featured in the Panorama section of the 2011 Berlin Film Festival.

It was observed, "If Man at Sea isn’t the director’s best work – although it certainly is his most ambitious – it’s because of his inability to orchestrate the internal rhythms of the conflict." Movies Ltd. listed the diverse sociological issues that the movie deals with: "Illegal immigration, family loss, financial crisis, illegality". Boyd van Hoeij wrote, "Giannaris’s latest plays more like 'Around the World in 80 Plot Twists.'"

References

External links
 

2011 films
2011 drama films
Greek drama films
2010s Greek-language films
Films about immigration
Seafaring films
Films set in the Mediterranean Sea